Along for the Ride is a 2022 American romantic drama film written and directed by Sofia Alvarez, based on the novel of the same name by Sarah Dessen. The film stars Emma Pasarow, Belmont Cameli, Kate Bosworth, Laura Kariuki, Andie MacDowell and Dermot Mulroney. The film was released on May 6, 2022 by Netflix.
The film's official logline reads: "The summer before college Auden meets the mysterious Eli, a fellow insomniac. While the seaside town of Colby sleeps, the two embark on a nightly quest to help Auden experience the fun, carefree teen life she never knew she wanted."

Plot 
Recent high school graduate, 18 y.o. Auden West goes to stay with her father Robert in the small beachside town of Colby, wanting to spend a carefree summer reinventing herself before she leaves for college. A daughter of academics and an exemplary student, her mother objects to her wanting to spend time with her father. An absentee dad for years, locking himself away in his office to work on his studies, he has an infant and is remarried to Heidi.

Upon Heidi’s suggestion, Auden goes to the Tip on her first day. As she’s experimenting, she makes out with a guy, later regretting it. Heidi takes her in to her shop the next day, where she’s to look after the receipts. She comes face to face with three girls she’d seen at the Tip (Maggie is the ex of the guy she made out with). Now they all work together.

A loner and night-person, Auden roams the streets after everyone else is asleep. Ten days after her arrival she meets fellow insomniac Eli. A BMXer, he takes her on nightly adventures and he challenges her to a quest to do all the things she missed out on in her childhood. On their first outing, they go to a secret pie shop, and he introduces her to Connect Four. On the next, they play mini golf and she admits she never got to wear her prom dress.

Auden’s mom turns up on a rainy day, taking her for lunch. She’s obviously envious of her ex and Heidi. Auden gets closer to the girls, being invited both to watch Maggie do cross-country BMXing and to a Conch House party. There she finds out about Eli’s accident where a drunk driver killed his best friend Abe.

During an outing to the drive-in to see The Princess Bride, Auden and Eli talk about being night-owls. She admits that it started when she was a child, from trying to prevent her parents from fighting, but as usual, he doesn’t share. That night she finds videos of him and Abe on YouTube.

Another evening, Auden says yes to the quest, so they break into the lighthouse. Later, talking in Eli’s truck, he pushes the idea of learning to ride a bike again, and she tries to bring up his BMXing, but neither want to talk about it. A night when he is wheeling her around in a shopping cart, it falls over and, although she’s OK, he apologises profusely.

When Auden brings up the HDP (hot dog party) annual July 4 party, Eli tells her to have fun, refusing to go. Hours later he actually shows up, surprising everyone. To get everyone to forget about it, she and Eli start a food fight. Soon afterwards, a night swim is invoked by all, and Auden and Eli kiss for the first time under the fireworks.
 
On a coffee run, Auden gets side-tracked. Seeing her dad with a suitcase in front of the café, he complains that all new moms are nuts. She calls him out on his mistakes, that he quits the moment things get hard. Auden checks in with Heidi, who explains she lost it because he wouldn’t even go out as a family on the 4th, her favorite. Calling her mom for support, as she’s an advocate for women’s rights, she drives to the house to give moral support. Between that talk and Auden calling him out, her dad comes back and starts helping out with the baby.

Auden and Eli have a temporary falling out over biking, she because she won’t admit she never learned and he because he’s mostly abandoned BMXing because of Abe’s death. She asks Maggie to teach her and he gets back to training. Some days later, Auden’s called to the skate park to see Eli compete. After his win she congratulates him, and they make up.

Eli shows up, wearing a tux, so Auden comes out wearing her prom dress. She bikes with him to the beach, their friends join them also dressed for the prom, and they have an impromptu party.

The closing scene is of Auden rereading a postcard from Eli in Barcelona before she and Maggie, college roommates, head to lunch.

Cast
 Emma Pasarow as Auden
 Belmont Cameli as Eli
 Kate Bosworth as Heidi
 Laura Kariuki as Maggie
 Andie MacDowell as Victoria
 Dermot Mulroney as Robert
 Genevieve Hannelius as Leah
 Samia Finnerty as Esther
 Paul Karmiryan as Adam
 Marcus Scribner as Wallace
 Ricardo Hurtado as Jake

Production
In April 2021, Deadline Hollywood announced that production had begun on a film adaptation of Sarah Dessen's 2009 novel Along for the Ride after Netflix acquired film rights. Sofia Alvarez, who had previously adapted two of Jenny Han's novels for the platform, was hired to write the screenplay and direct the film.

Principal photography began on April 22, 2021 in Carolina Beach, North Carolina, with location shooting in the North Carolina localities of Wilmington, Kure Beach and Oak Island. Filming continued through early June which included shooting at County Line MX, located in Bolton, North Carolina.

Release
Along for the Ride debuted on Netflix on May 6, 2022.

Reception
 A large majority of the criticism towards the film is from reviewers claiming that the film is a dumbed down version of Dessens novel, while others claimed the film was cheesy but had compelling and emotional moments with great performances by the actors. At least one critic claimed the film lacks the continuous spark of a traditional teen rom-com, seen in To All The Boys I've Loved Before, and laid 
partial blame on the perceived flat and bottled Auden portrayal by Pasarow. The flatness of the characters was echoed by a New York Times reviewer that claimed the characters had all majorly been dumbed down to present an "Instagram-friendly" adaptation, leaving the film with no clear conflict or stakes. Another reviewer highlighted the effect of the films shooting location, claiming that along with the script and actresses, the shooting locations in North Carolina helped bring the films setting to life.

References

External links
 
 
 

2022 films
American drama films
Films shot in North Carolina
Films based on American novels
2022 drama films
2020s English-language films
English-language Netflix original films
2020s American films